The Council of Jamnia (presumably Yavneh in the Holy Land) was a council purportedly held late in the 1st century CE to finalize the canon of the Hebrew Bible. The writing of the Birkat haMinim benediction is attributed to Shmuel ha-Katan at the supposed Council of Jamnia.

The theory of a council of Jamnia that finalized the canon, first proposed by Heinrich Graetz in 1871, was popular for much of the 20th century. However, it was increasingly questioned from the 1960s onward, and the theory has been largely discredited.

Background
The Talmud relates that some time before the destruction of the Second Temple in 70 AD, Rabbi Yohanan ben Zakkai relocated to the city of Yavneh, where he received permission from the Romans to found a school of halakha (Jewish religious law).

The theory
The Mishnah, compiled at the end of the 2nd century, describes a debate over the status of some books of Ketuvim, and in particular over whether or not they . Yadaim 3:5 calls attention to a debate over Song of Songs and Ecclesiastes. The Megillat Taanit, in a discussion of days when fasting is prohibited but that are not noted in the Bible, mentions the holiday of Purim. Based on these, and a few similar references, Heinrich Graetz concluded in 1871 that there had been a Council of Jamnia (or Yavne in Hebrew) which had decided the Jewish canon sometime in the late 1st century (c. 70–90).

Refutation
W. M. Christie was the first to dispute this popular theory  in an article entitled "The Jamnia Period in Jewish History". Jack P. Lewis wrote a critique of the popular consensus entitled "What Do We Mean by Jabneh?". Sid Z. Leiman made an independent challenge for his University of Pennsylvania thesis published later as a book in 1976. Raymond E. Brown largely supported Lewis in his review published in the Jerome Biblical Commentary (also appears in the New Jerome Biblical Commentary of 1990), as did Lewis' discussion of the topic in 1992's Anchor Bible Dictionary.

Albert C. Sundberg Jr. summarized the crux of Lewis' argument as follows:

Jewish sources contain echoes of debate about biblical books but canonicity was not the issue and debate was not connected with Jabneh... Moreover, specific canonical discussion at Jabneh is attested only for Chronicles and Song of Songs. Both circulated prior to Jabneh. There was vigorous debate between Beth Shammai and Beth Hillel over Chronicles and Song; Beth Hillel affirmed that both "defile the hands", the rabbinic principle (enunciated in Mishnah Yadayim 3:5) according to which the Holy Scripture is so holy that they impart uncleanness; writings that are not holy, do not impart uncleanness. One text does speak of official action at Jabneh. It gives a blanket statement that "all Holy Scripture defile the hands", and adds "on the day they made R. Eleazar b. Azariah head of the college, the Song of Songs and Koheleth (Ecclesiastes) both render the hands unclean" (M. Yadayim 3.5). Of the apocryphal books, only Ben Sira is mentioned by name in rabbinic sources and it continued to be circulated, copied and cited. No book is ever mentioned in the sources as being excluded from the canon at Jabneh.

According to Lewis:

The concept of the Council of Jamnia is an hypothesis to explain the canonization of the Writings (the third division of the Hebrew Bible) resulting in the closing of the Hebrew canon. ...These ongoing debates suggest the paucity of evidence on which the hypothesis of the Council of Jamnia rests and raise the question whether it has not served its usefulness and should be relegated to the limbo of unestablished hypotheses. It should not be allowed to be considered a consensus established by mere repetition of assertion.

The 20th-century evangelical scholar F. F. Bruce thought that it was "probably unwise to talk as if there were a Council or Synod of Jamnia which laid down the limits of the Old Testament canon." Other scholars have since joined in and today the theory is largely discredited. Some hold that the Hebrew canon was established  during the Hasmonean dynasty (140–40 BCE).

References

Sources
 Kantor, Mattis, The Jewish timeline encyclopaedia: a year-by-year history from Creation to the present day, Jason Aronson Inc., Northvale N.J., 1992

External links
 Robert C. Newman, 'The Council of Jamnia and the Old Testament Canon' (1983), an in-depth discussion of the subject on the site of the Interdisciplinary Biblical Research Institute.
 Bob Stanley, 'The Deuterocanonicals' (2002), an interpretation of "The Council of Jamnia" presented on the website of The Catholic Treasure Chest.
 Jewish Encyclopedia: Academy of Jabneh
 Jewish Encyclopedia: Birkat ha-Minim
 Jewish Encyclopedia: Min
 "The Old Testament of the Early Church" Revisited, Albert C. Sundberg, Jr., 1997

1st century in religion
Jews and Judaism in the Roman Empire
Judaism-related controversies
Yavne
History of the Hebrew Bible